Carlos Enrique Vázquez del Mercado (31 July 1950 – 16 June 2011) was a Mexican footballer who played as a goalkeeper.

Career
Born in Guadalajara, Jalisco, Vázquez began playing football with the youth sides of C.D. Guadalajara. In 1969, he joined the senior side as the third goalkeeper. In order to get regular playing time, Vázquez went on loan to Club América for the 1969–70 season. He made his professional debut under América manager Walter Ormeño, but returned to Guadalajara the following season.

Vázquez played sparingly for Guadalajara before venturing on a journeyman's career with Atlético Español, Tiburones Rojos de Veracruz, Club Universidad Nacional, Tecos, Atlante F.C. and Jaibos Del Tampico before retiring at age 32. He won the 1976–77 Mexican Primera División title with Pumas.

Personal
Vázquez died from a heart attack at age 61.

References

External links

1950 births
2011 deaths
Mexican footballers
C.D. Guadalajara footballers
Club América footballers
C.D. Veracruz footballers
Club Universidad Nacional footballers
Tecos F.C. footballers
Atlante F.C. footballers
Association football goalkeepers